Matanyahu Englman (b. June 8, 1966) is the State Comptroller and Ombudsman of the State of Israel.He is also the first Vice-President of EUROSAI, the European Organization of Supreme Audit Institutions. He is slated to become president of the organization in 2024.

Biography
Matanyahu Englman was born in Jerusalem to Binyamin (Robert) and Chasia Englman, and grew up in Rehovot. His father was a physicist at the Soreq Institute. His maternal grandfather was Yehuda Kiel, who was awarded the Israel Prize in Jewish Studies in 1992 for his commentary on the Bible. Englman earned a BA in economics and accounting and an MA in business administration from the Hebrew University of Jerusalem. Englman is married to Avigail, a social worker, daughter of former Governor of the Bank of Israel Moshe Mandelbaum. They live in Nof Ayalon and have six children. Englman is a marathon runner who has participated in seven marathons.

Accounting career
From 1991-1999, Englman worked as a CPA for Fahn, Kanneh & Co. (a member firm of Grant Thorton International).

Public service career
From 1999-2005, Englman was Deputy Director General of the Jerusalem College of Engineering.
In 2004-2017, Englman served as Audit Committee Director of Joint Israel and its affiliated organizations. From 2005-2010, he was CEO of the Shoham Local Council. In 2010, he was appointed Deputy Director-General of the Technion – Israel Institute of Technology. In 2014, he was promoted to Executive Vice President and Director-General. In 2018-2019, he served as CEO of the Council for Higher Education in Israel.

Englman was elected by the Knesset to the office of State Comptroller in June 2019, defeating Giora Romm, the opposition candidate, in a secret ballot. He took office  on July 4, 2019. Englman was the first non-judge to be elected to the oversight role in over three decades and described as having a less-activist, more conservative approach to the position.

In September 2019, it was reported that Englman re-approved Netanyahu's request to receive a 2 million shekel loan for his legal defense from an American businessman. The decision was criticized by the Movement for Quality Government in Israel. Englman's predecessor, Yosef Shapira had agreed to approve the loan if it was at market rates and there was no conflict of interest.
In 2020, following the recommendation of the Attorney General of Israel, the State Comptroller's ministerial permissions committee denied Netanyahu's funding request, deeming  it an improper gift to a government official.

Eurosai
 
At the EUROSAI Congress in Prague in April 2021, Englman was elected next president of the organization. In his acceptance speech, he pledged to “work in the spirit of the organization to promote auditing practices that are contemporary, relevant, professional, enterprising, progressive and innovative, for the public good." As vice president, of EUROSAI, he co-authored a report with SAI from other countries on the need for change in the global workforce, setting goals for the coming year.

Audit reports

In preparation for submitting his first reports in December 2019, Engelman announced a change of format to make the reports more accessible to the public. The reports are short and concise, focusing on ten main findings, and incorporate the use of infographics.
Englman published 107 reports in 2020 and 108 reports in 2021.  These reports have covered a wide variety of topics, with a special emphasis on climate  and cyber security. In 2021, Englman warned that a chronic shortage of skilled employees in the Israeli high-tech sector posed a strategic threat to the high-tech industry and Israeli economy. Based on his findings, he also  claimed that Israel is unprepared for a climate crisis, which could lead to shortages of food and water, economic decline and public health issues.

In August 2020, Englman issued a report criticizing the Mossad for growing far beyond its approved budget in recent years.

In October 2020, Englman recommended the end of Shin Bet surveillance of citizens infected with coronavirus in a position that was at odds with the policy of Binyamin Netanyahu, although he avoided challenging the prime minister directly.

In his report on the performance of law enforcement and security forces during the riots in Israel’s mixed cities during Operation Guardian of the Walls in May 2021, Englman found major deficiencies in the handling of these incidents. His recommendations included teaching Arabic to Israel Police officers and hiring more Arab municipal works in the mixed cities. He urged the prosecutor’s office to take action against those involved in violating public order on racial or nationalist grounds and recommended a restructuring of intelligence sharing. He also announced a special audit into the stampede at Mount Meron in northern Israel, where 45 people were crushed to death, but a month later called it off on the grounds that the Israeli Supreme Court inquiry was sufficient.

Constructive Audit Reform
In September 2019, soon after taking office, Englman presented an outline for “Constructive Audit Reform”  based on “up-to-date models of  international audit.” Among the fundamental principles of this reform are adopting a statewide perspective; focusing on audit topics with social implications; performing surprise audits; wider use of tools like public questionaries, polls and sampling; employing advanced audit models such as those used in the United States and England; compiling report abstracts that emphasize the “top 5” findings and recommendations; greater used of computerized audit tools and datamining; introducing different types of audits; and enhancing the human resources skill mix.

References 

State Comptrollers of Israel
Hebrew University of Jerusalem alumni
Israel
Israeli accountants
Israeli Jews
1966 births
Living people
21st-century Israeli civil servants